Scaptomyza is a genus of vinegar flies, insects in the family Drosophilidae. , there are 273 described species of Scaptomyza. Of those, 148 are endemic to the Hawaiian archipelago. This genus is part of the species-rich lineage of Hawaiian Drosophilidae, and is the sister lineage to the endemic Hawaiian Drosophila. The genus Scaptomyza is one of several nested within the paraphyletic genus Drosophila.

Two hypotheses have been proposed to explain the geographical distribution of Scaptomyza. The "single Hawaiian origin" hypothesis suggests that the common ancestor of Scaptomyza and Hawaiian Drosophila colonized Hawaii once, followed by several migrations to the mainland within Scaptomyza. Alternatively, the "multiple Hawaiian origins" hypothesis suggests that the current distribution is the result of multiple colonization events (once for Hawaiian Drosophila and multiple times in Scaptomyza).

One member of the genus in particular, S. flava, is studied as a laboratory model organism for herbivory and the evolution of plant-insect interactions.

One specimen, assigned to the species S. dominicana, has been described from Dominican amber that is estimated to have been deposited at least 23 million years ago.

See also
 List of Scaptomyza species

References

Further reading

External links

 

Drosophilidae genera
Articles created by Qbugbot
Drosophilidae